Matka Joanna is an album by Polish jazz trumpeter and composer Tomasz Stańko recorded in 1994 and released on the ECM label.  The music was inspired by Jerzy Kawalerowicz's 1961 movie Matka Joanna od Aniołów.

Reception
The Allmusic review awarded the album 4 stars.

Track listing
All compositions by Tomasz Stańko except as indicated.

 "Monastery in the Dark" (Anders Jormin, Tony Oxley, Tomasz Stańko, Bobo Stenson) - 5:53
 "Green Sky" - 9:37 
 "Maldoror's War Song" - 8:15
 "Tales for a Girl, 12" - 9:09 
 "Matka Joanna from the Angels" (Jormin, Oxley, Stańko, Stenson) - 10:47
 "Cain's Brand" - 8:38 
 "Nun's Mood" (Jormin, Oxley, Stańko, Stenson) - 3:03
 "Celina" - 6:45 
 "Two Preludes for Tales" (Stańko, Stenson) - 1:35
 "Klostergeist" (Oxley) - 4:22

Personnel
Tomasz Stańko - trumpet
Bobo Stenson - piano
Anders Jormin - bass
Tony Oxley - drums

References

ECM Records albums
Tomasz Stańko albums
1995 albums
Albums produced by Manfred Eicher